The 2012 Arctic Winter Games was a winter multi-sport event which took place in Whitehorse, Yukon , Canada, between  4–10 March 2012.

The Arctic Winter Games is the world's largest multisport and cultural event for young people of the Arctic. The Games is an international biennial celebration of circumpolar sports and culture held for a week, each time with a different nation or region as the host. AWG celebrates sports, social interaction and culture. The Games contributes to creating an awareness on cultural diversity, and develops athletes to participate in the competitions with the focus on fair play. The Games binds the Arctic countries together and includes traditional games such as Arctic sports and Dené games.

Around 1,500 athletes from nine teams participated in the games.

Organization
The 2012 Arctic Winter Games were set in Whitehorse, Yukon. This marked this the sixth times the games were hosted by Whitehorse. The general manager of the games were Chris Milner, an athlete in the 1990 Arctic Winter Games.

Marketing
2012's mascot was a Husky dog named 'Borealis'. The dog sports a Whitehorse Arctic Winter Games 2012 shirt and, as is common in Huskies, has different coloured eyes (known as heterochromia).

Participants
Nine contingents participated in the 2012 Arctic Winter Games. The amount of athletes sent by each contingent is shown in parenthesis in the list below.
 Alaska, United States (281)
 Greenland (91) 
 Northern Alberta, Canada (179)
 Northwest Territories, Canada (276) 
 Nunavik, Quebec, Canada (53)
 Nunavut, Canada (227)
 Sámi people (33)
 Yamalo-Nenets, Russia (62)
 Yukon, Canada (270) (host)

Venues
The 2012 games were held at various sports venues, schools and facilities in Whitehorse.

Sports venues

The following venues hosted sports events during the games. All locations were located within Whitehorse.

Cultural venues

The following venues hosted cultural events during the games. All locations were located within Whitehorse.

Medal tally

The Games

Sports
264 events in 20 sport disciplines were scheduled in the 2012 Arctic Winter Games program. Freestyle skiing was removed from the program, after its debut appearance at the 2010 Arctic Winter Games. 4 skiing sports were held, with alpine skiing, biathlon, cross-country skiing and snowboarding. 2 snowshoe events were held, with snowshoe biathlon and snowshoeing. 2 racquet sports were held, with badminton and table tennis. 2 skating events were held, those being figure skating and short track speed skating. Team sports held were basketball, indoor soccer, ice hockey, volleyball and curling. Traditional Inuit sports were also held, with Arctic sports, Dene games, dog mushing and wrestling, the latter also including events for traditional wrestling. Also held was gymnastics.

Calendar

Culture
The 2012 Arctic Winter Games were the first to have a relay. Rather than passing a baton or torch, however, a song was relayed. The youth at the games passed on a song, was in effort to promoting heritage awareness and cultural diversity.

Hodgson Trophy
The Hodgson trophy for fair play and team spirit is awarded at the end of every games. The trophy has been awarded since 1978 and named for Stuart Milton Hodgson, Commissioners of the Northwest Territories from 1967 to 1979. The 2012 Hodgson Trophy was awarded to Team Nunavut.

References

External links
Arctic Winter Games 2012 Official Site
Arctic Winter Games Official Site

 
 

Arctic Winter Games, 2012
Arctic Winter Games
2012
Multi-sport events in Canada
Winter multi-sport events in Canada
International sports competitions hosted by Canada
March 2012 sports events in Canada
Arctic Winter
Sport in Yukon